Esslingen is a village in the municipality of Egg, Switzerland, in the canton of Zürich. It is located in the Pfannenstiel region, approximately 15 km southeast of Zürich. In the local dialect it is called Esslinge.

The population is 1752.

Transport 
Esslingen railway station is the terminus of the Forchbahn, a tram-train service from the city of Zürich that is also known as service S18 of the Zürich S-Bahn. The town is also served by buses on route 842 of the Verkehrsbetriebe Zürichsee und Oberland, which links Uster and Oetwil am See.

Esslingen is connected by the Autostrasse A52 to Zumikon and Hinwil.

References

External links 

Villages in the canton of Zürich